Francisco de Assis Ciríaco dos Santos (born 5 November 1955), known as Francisco Diá, is a Brazilian football coach.

Career
Born in Natal, Rio Grande do Norte, Diá started his career with hometown side  in 1995. He took over ABC in the following year, and then worked with Penapolense, São Gonçalo-RN and Alecrim before returning to ABC in 2004.

In 2009, while in charge of Alecrim, Diá achieved promotion to the Série C with the club before leaving. In October, he was appointed América de Natal, and left the club in the following month to take over Mogi Mirim after avoiding relegation in the Série B.

Diá was sacked by Mogi in February 2010, after five consecutive defeats, and subsequently returned to América. He resigned from his latter club in March, and worked with Botafogo-PB for the remainder of the year.

Diá returned to América for a third spell in May 2011, but was relieved of his duties two months later. He was appointed at the helm of Baraúnas for the ensuing campaign in late October, and also worked at Santa Cruz-RN and Icasa throughout the 2012 campaign.

Diá was sacked by Icasa in June 2013, and took over Grêmio Barueri in August. He left in September, after five losses in five matches and a subsequent relegation to the Série D, and was named manager of Nacional-AM.

On 5 August 2014, Diá was presented at ASA, but was dismissed eight days later after just one match. He took over Campinense late in the month, and led the club to two consecutive Campeonato Paraibano titles before leaving in June 2016.

On 26 June 2016, six days after leaving Campinense, Diá returned to América for a fourth spell. He left in October after the club's relegation, and was named Altos manager for the 2017 campaign shortly after.

On 27 February 2017, Diá left Altos to manage Sampaio Corrêa. He won the year's Campeonato Maranhense and achieved promotion with the club in the season, but was sacked in May 2018 after a poor start in the second division.

On 28 July 2018, Diá returned to Campinense for the 2019 campaign, but resigned in May 2019. He returned to ABC in September, but opted to leave the club in December 2020 after refusing a wage cut.

On 17 December 2020, Diá was appointed Ferroviário manager, but resigned the following 5 September. For the 2022 season, he took over Juazeirense and Pouso Alegre before returning to Altos on 26 April. He only lasted 19 days at the latter club before being sacked on 16 May. 

On 4 July 2022, Diá returned to Ferroviário, but was unable to prevent their relegation from the third division. On 23 January 2023, he replaced Moisés Egert at the helm of Botafogo-PB, but was himself sacked on 3 March.

Honours
Botafogo-PB
Copa Paraíba: 2010

Nacional-AM
Campeonato Amazonense: 2014

Campinense
Campeonato Paraibano: 2015, 2016

Sampaio Corrêa
Campeonato Maranhense: 2017

ABC
Campeonato Potiguar: 2020

References

External links
 

1955 births
Living people
People from Natal, Rio Grande do Norte
Sportspeople from Rio Grande do Norte
Brazilian football managers
Campeonato Brasileiro Série B managers
Campeonato Brasileiro Série C managers
Campeonato Brasileiro Série D managers
ABC Futebol Clube managers
Clube Atlético Penapolense managers
América Futebol Clube (RN) managers
Mogi Mirim Esporte Clube managers
Botafogo Futebol Clube (PB) managers
Associação Desportiva Recreativa e Cultural Icasa managers
Grêmio Barueri Futebol managers
Nacional Futebol Clube managers
Oeste Futebol Clube managers
Agremiação Sportiva Arapiraquense managers
Campinense Clube managers
Associação Atlética de Altos managers
Sampaio Corrêa Futebol Clube managers
Ferroviário Atlético Clube (CE) managers
Sociedade Desportiva Juazeirense managers
Pouso Alegre Futebol Clube managers